South Korea competed at the 2002 Winter Paralympics in Salt Lake City, United States. 6 competitors from South Korea won a single silver medal and finished 21st in the medal table.

See also 
 South Korea at the Paralympics
 South Korea at the 2002 Winter Olympics

References 

South Korea at the Paralympics
2002 in South Korean sport
Nations at the 2002 Winter Paralympics